Yatsuko Kaneko Tanami (Japanese: 丹阿弥 谷津子, born 25 June 1924) is a Japanese actress, known for her performance during the Golden Age of Japanese film.

Early years 
Her real name is Yatsuko Kaneko. Her father, Tanami Iwakichi (1901-1992), was a painter from Tokyo who studied under Taikan Yokoyama. Her mother, Tomie, was a paulownia doll artist from Hikami-cho, Hyogo Prefecture (currently Tamba City). Her younger sister Tanami Niwako (1927-) became a copperplate engraver after entering Bunka Gakuin.

Her family lived in Atelier Village in Nagasaki, Toshima Ward.

Education 
In 1937, she graduated from Tokyo Higher Normal School Attached Elementary School and from Tokyo Prefectural 10th High School for Girls. In 1942, she graduated from Bunka Gakuin Faculty of Literature. In 1942 she became a research student at the Bungakuza. In the same year she made her debut in "Matsugoro Tomishima". In 1945, she gained attention for her role as Anya in the new theater joint performance "The Cherry Orchard", and since then she has been known as an actress with both her beauty and acting skills, such as Roxanne in "Cyrano" and Fanny in "Marius".

Career 
On 24 March 1954, she left for France to attend the Cannes Film Festival. 

In 1964, she formed "Gekidan NLT" with Yukio Mishima, who had left Bungakuza due to the incident. She left the company in 1966 and formed a new group, New Theater Club Marui, with Kaneko. In 1967, she won the Encouragement Prize at the Arts Festival for "Love and Death of an Actress". In 2000, she won the 10th Japan Film Critics Award for Lifetime Achievement. She has made many appearances in TV dramas as the grandmother of her main character. She has appeared in commercials for Paramount Bed, Sawai Pharmaceutical, and others.

Personal life 
She was married to actor Nobuo Kaneko until his death in 1995.

Filmography

Film

Television

References

External links
 

1924 births
Living people
20th-century Japanese actresses
Japanese film actresses
Japanese television actresses
People from Tokyo